Wuyang may refer to Chinese places:

Wuyang County, in Henan, China

Wuyang New Town, in Guangzhou, Guangdong, China

Towns and townships
 Wuyang, Suining (武阳镇), a town of Suining County, Hunan province.
Wuyang, Zhang County (武阳镇), town and county seat of Zhang County, Gansu

People
Wu Yang, a female table tennis player. Winner of the 2009 ITTF Junior World Championships, runner up in the 2009 China Open and 2010 Austrian Open, she is currently ranked 11th on the ITTF world ranking.